In the run up to the 2021 Japanese general election, various organisations carried out opinion polling to gauge voting intention. Results of such polls are displayed in this article. The date range for these opinion polls is from the previous general election, held on 22 October 2017 to 31 October 2021.

Graphical summary 
The charts below depict party identification polling for the next Japanese general election using a 15-poll moving average.

Party identification

2021

2020

2019

2018

2017

Voting intention (party vote)

2021

2020

Voting intention (District vote)

2021

Preferred outcome

2021

Seat projections

2021

Preferred Prime Minister

Note: Polls phrase this question as "Who should be leader of the LDP for the next term?" or "Who should be Prime Minister for the next term?", including Opposition Leader Yukio Edano only in the latter case. Because of this, some polls excluded Shinzō Abe (even while he was the incumbent), as he had already been elected as LDP leader three times, the maximum presently allowed under party rules.

2021

2020

Cabinet approval/disapproval ratings

Graphical summary

2021

2020

2019

2018

2017

Notes

References 

Next